Renaud Camus (born Jean Renaud Gabriel Camus on 10 August 1946) is a French novelist, conspiracy theorist, and white nationalist writer. He is the inventor of the "Great Replacement", a far-right conspiracy theory that claims that a "global elite" is colluding against the white population of Europe to replace them with non-European peoples.

Camus's "Great Replacement" theory has been translated on far-right websites and adopted by far-right groups to reinforce the white genocide conspiracy theory. Camus has repeatedly condemned and publicly disavowed violent acts perpetrated by far-right terrorists.

Early life and career as a fiction writer

Family and education (1946–1977) 
Jean Renaud Gabriel Camus was born on 10 August 1946 in Chamalières, Auvergne, a rural town in central France. Raised in a bourgeois family, he is the son of Léon Camus, an entrepreneur, and Catherine Gourdiat, a lawyer. His parents removed him from their will after he revealed his homosexuality. At 21, then a socialist, he participated in pro-LGBT marches during the May 1968 events in Paris.

Camus earned a baccalauréat in philosophy in Clermont-Ferrand, Auvergne, in 1963. He then spent a year at a non-university college, St Clare's, Oxford (1965–1966). He earned a bachelor in French literature at the Sorbonne University in Paris (1969), a master in philosophy at the Paris Institute of Political Studies (1970), and two Master of Advanced Studies (DES) in political science (1970) and history of law (1971) at the University Panthéon-Assas. He taught French literature at the Hendrix College in Conway, Arkansas from 1971 to 1972, then was redactor in political science for the encyclopedia publisher Grolier from 1972 to 1976. He was also a professional reader and literature advisor at French book publisher Denoël from 1970 to 1976.

Influential gay writer (1978–1995) 
After settling back in Paris in 1978, Camus quickly began to circulate among writers and artists the likes of Roland Barthes, Andy Warhol, or Gilbert & George. Known exclusively as a novelist and poet until the late 1990s, Camus received the Prix Fénéon in 1977 for his novel Échange, and in 1996 the Prix Amic from the Académie Française for his previous novels and elegies.

Called retrospectively by some English-language media an "edgy gay writer", Camus published in 1979 Tricks, a "chronicle" consisting of descriptions of homosexual encounters in France and elsewhere, with a preface by philosopher Roland Barthes; it remains Camus's most translated work. Tricks and Buena Vista Park, published in 1980, were deemed influential in the LGBT community at that time. Camus was also a columnist for the French gay magazine Gai Pied. This period of Camus's life has led American magazine The Nation to label him a "gay icon" who "became the ideologue of white supremacy," although Camus had rejected the concept of "homosexual writer" by 1982.

Camus was a member of the Socialist Party during the 1970s and 1980s, and he voted for François Mitterrand in 1981, winner of the French presidential election. Thirty-one years later, during the 2012 presidential campaign, he dismissed the party with the following remark: "The Socialist Party has published a political program titled Pour changer de civilisation ("To change civilization"). We are among those who, to the contrary, refuse to change civilization."

In 1992, at the age of 46, using the money from the sale of his Paris apartment, Camus bought and began to restore a 14th-century castle in Plieux, a village in Occitanie. In 1996, he had the epiphany which he said led to the concept of the "Great Replacement". As of 2019, Camus still lives in the castle. Because he received government funds to assist in the restoration of the castle – which included the rebuilding of a 10-story tower removed in the 17th century – Camus is required to open it to the public for a part of the year.

The Great Replacement

Development (1996–2011) 

Camus stated in a 2016 interview with British magazine The Spectator that he began to develop his theory in 1996, while editing a guidebook about the department of Hérault. He claimed that he "suddenly realised that in very old villages ... the population had totally changed" and added, "this is when I began to write like that."

Camus supported for a time the left-wing souverainist politician Jean-Pierre Chevènement, then voted for the ecologist candidate Noël Mamère in the 2002 presidential election. The same year, he founded his own racialist political party, the Parti de l'In-nocence ("Party of No-harm"), although it was not publicly launched until the 2012 presidential election. The party advocates remigration, i.e. sending all immigrants and their families back to the country of their origin, and a complete cessation of future immigration.

He also declared that a key to understanding his "Great Replacement" theory can be found in a book about aesthetics he published in 2002, titled Du Sens ("Of Meaning"). In the latter, inspired by a dialog between Plato and Cratylus, he wrote that the words "France" and "French" equal a natural and physical reality, not a legal one; it is a form of cratylism similar to Charles Maurras' distinction between the "legal country" and the "real country." Camus also built on the earlier work of Jean Raspail, who published the dystopian novel The Camp of the Saints in 1973, a fictional story about immigration and the destruction of Western civilization.

Political activism (2012–present) 
He was a candidate in the 2012 French presidential election, with a program ranging from "serious proposals, such as the repatriation of foreign-born criminals", to unusual themes in French politics, such as "the right to silence, abolishing wind-farms, banning roadside ads, making sanctuaries of remaining unspoiled places, stopping the production of cars that can go faster than the speed limit, and recognising Israel, Palestine and a Greater Lebanon for Christians in the Middle East." He nonetheless failed to gain enough elected representatives presentations to be able to run for president, and eventually decided to support Marine Le Pen.

In 2015 Camus headed an initiative to launch Pegida France alongside Pierre Cassen of Riposte Laïque, Jean-Luc Addor of the Swiss People's Party, Pierre Renversez of the Belgian "No to Islam" and Melanie Dittmer of the German Pegida.

In December 2017, he declared: "The presidential election that took place [in 2017] was the last chance for a political solution. I don't believe in a political solution ... because in 2022, this time, it will be the occupants, the invaders [i.e. the immigrants] who will vote, who will be the masters of the elections, so anyway the solution is no longer political".

In May 2019, Camus ran, along with Karim Ouchikh, for the European parliament elections: "we shall not leave Europe, we shall make Africa leave Europe," they wrote to define their agenda. During the campaign, a photograph of a candidate on his ballot kneeling before a giant swastika drawn on a beach re-emerged on social media. Camus decided to withdraw from the election, claiming that the swastika was "the opposite of everything [he had] fought for [his] whole life." During the 2022 French presidential election, he sided with far-right pundit and presidential candidate Éric Zemmour.

Views

The Great Replacement 
Since his 2010 and 2011 books L'Abécédaire de l'in-nocence ("Abecedarium of no-harm") and Le Grand Remplacement ("The Great Replacement")—both unpublished in English—Camus has been warning of the purported danger of the "Great Replacement". The conspiracy theory supposes that "replacist elites" are colluding against the White French and Europeans in order to replace them with non-European peoples—specifically Muslim populations from Africa and the Middle East—through mass migration, demographic growth and a drop in the European birth rate; a supposed process he labeled "genocide by substitution." To promote his theory, Camus participated in two conferences organised by Bloc Identitaire in December 2010 and November 2012.

On 9 November 2017, Camus founded, with Karim Ouchikh, the National Council of European Resistance, an allusion to the WWII French National Council of the Resistance. The pan-European movement—with other members the likes of Jean-Yves Le Gallou, Bernard Lugan, Václav Klaus, Filip Dewinter or Janice Atkinson—seeks to oppose the "Great Replacement", immigration to Europe, and to defeat "replacist totalitarianism". In 2017, French essayist Alain Finkielkraut caused controversy after he invited Camus to debate the "Great Replacement" on the literary talk show Répliques at the public radio France Culture. Finkielkraut justified his choice by arguing that Camus, who "is heard and seen nowhere, has shaped an expression that we hear everywhere." After white supremacist protesters at the 2017 Unite The Right Rally in Charlottesville, Virginia were heard chanting "You will not replace us" and "Jews will not replace us," Camus stated that he did not support Nazis or violence, but that he could understand why white Americans felt angry about being replaced, and that he approved of the sentiment. In November 2018, he released a book directly written in English and intended for an international audience, titled You Will Not Replace Us!

As of February 2023, he continued to defend the "Great Replacement" conspiracy theory on his Twitter account, which had around 54,000 followers at the time of its permanent suspension in October 2021. Camus's account was reactivated in January 2023 thanks to a policy of general amnesty announced by Twitter's new owner Elon Musk.

White nationalist violence 
Camus has repeatedly said that he condemns the violent attacks and terrorism committed in echo with his ideas, dismissing them as "Occupier's [i.e. immigrant's] practices." While he denies stigmatizing all Muslims, Camus believes in an unbroken line between petty crime and Islamic terrorism: "all the terrorists are known by the police, not for terrorist acts or for religious extremism, but by petty larceny and bank attacks, or even by very small things like attacking old ladies in suburban trains, or conflicts between neighbours", adding in another speech: "we are talking about the fight against terrorism: in my opinion there are no terrorists, not a single one. There are occupants who ... kill a few hostages from time to time to better remind us who the master is." 

Scholars Nicolas Bancel, Pascal Blanchard and Ahmed Boubeker state that "the announcement of a civil war is implicit in the theory of the 'great replacement' ... This thesis is extreme—and so simplistic that it can be understood by anyone—because it validates a racial definition of the nation." In April 2014, Camus was fined €4,000 for incitement to racial hatred after he referred to Muslims as "hooligans" and "soldiers" and as "the armed wing of a group intent on conquering French territory and expelling the existing population from certain areas" during a conference organised by Bloc Identitaire and Riposte Laïque in December 2010. In April 2015, the Court of Appeal of Paris confirmed this decision.

Allegations of antisemitism 
In his diary of 1994—published in 2000 under the title La campagne de France—Renaud Camus commented on the fact that the membership of a regular panel of literary critics on the public radio France Culture comprised a majority of Jewish members who, in his view, tended to exclusively focus discussion on Jewish authors and community-centered issues. This accusation drew much criticism among some French journalists such as Marc Weitzmann or Jean Daniel, who denounced Camus's remarks as anti-Semitic. One editorial, signed by Frédéric Mitterrand, Emmanuel Carrère, Christian Combaz and Camille Laurens, defended Camus in the name of free speech, while another, signed by Jacques Derrida, Serge Klarsfeld, Claude Lanzmann, Jean-Pierre Vernant and Philippe Sollers, contended that racism and antisemitism, as allegedly displayed by Camus in his diary, are not entitled to this freedom.

Camus has since gained a number of defenders among French-Jewish conservative thinkers, most notably Alain Finkielkraut, who has taken his side in the controversy since 2000. "Demographic substitution," Finkielkraut said to The Nation in 2019, is "not a conspiracy theory," but he dismissed Camus's frequent talk of "genocide by substitution." Éric Zemmour, a French conservative journalist of Sephardic Jewish descent, is one of the most prominent mainstream advocates of Camus's theory. Additionally, various right-wing and far-right French-speaking Jewish websites, such as Dreuz.info, Europe-Israël or JssNews, have positively received Camus's conspiracy theory and have called their readership to study his books.

Political scientist Jean-Yves Camus and historian Nicolas Lebourg have noted that, contrary to its parent the white genocide conspiracy theory, Renaud Camus's "Great Replacement" does not include an antisemitic Jewish plot, which is, according to them, a reason for its success. French journalist Yann Moix, who had accused Camus of being an anti-Semite in 2017, was fined €3,000 by a French Court of Appeal for libel on 13 March 2019. Moix's conviction was overturned in January 2020 by the French Court of Cassation, judging that his comments "were the expression of an opinion and a value judgment on the personality of the plaintiff ... and not the imputation of a specific fact."

Democracy and multiculturalism 
Camus sees democracy as a degradation of high culture and favors a system whereby the elite are guardians of the culture, thus opposing multiculturalism.

LGBT rights 
Camus is openly gay and has given lukewarm support to same-sex marriage. He has said that homophobia and opposition to LGBT rights within conservative Islam justifies anti-Muslim sentiment, and that the mainstream left has often prioritised defending Islam and anti-racism over criticising Muslim homophobia.

Influence 
In a survey led by Ifop in December 2018, 25% of the French subscribed to the theory of the "Great Replacement"; as well as 46% of the responders who defined themselves as "Gilets Jaunes". In another survey led by Harris Interactive in October 2021, 61% of the French believed that the "Great Replacement" will happen in France; 67% of the respondents were worried about it. The theory has been cited by Canadian political activist Lauren Southern in a YouTube video of the same name released in July 2017. Southern's video had attracted in 2019 more than 670,000 viewers and is credited with helping to popularize the theory.

The "Great Replacement" theory is a key ideological component of Identitarianism, a strand of white nationalism that originated in France and has since gained popularity in Europe and the rest of the Western world.

Mass shootings 
Although Camus has repeatedly condemned and publicly disavowed violent acts perpetrated by far-right terrorists, several far-right terrorists, including the perpetrators of the 2019 Christchurch mosque shootings, the 2019 El Paso shooting, and the 2022 Buffalo shooting, have made reference to the "Great Replacement" conspiracy theory. According to scholars, his Great Replacement theory can only lead to acts of violence, by presenting non-whites as an existential threat to white people, and immigrants as a fifth column or an "internal enemy". Camus' use of strong terms like "colonization" and "Occupiers" to label non-European immigrants and their children (in analogy to the Nazi occupation of France), has been described by philosopher Alain Finkielkraut as implicit calls to violence.

2019 Christchurch mosque shootings 
The "Great Replacement" was also the name of a manifesto by terrorist Brenton Harrison Tarrant, the Australian-born perpetrator of the Christchurch mosque shootings that killed 51 people and injured 40 others. Camus condemned the massacre and described the shootings as a terrorist attack, also adding that Tarrant's manifesto had failed to understand the Great Replacement theory. Camus said that he suspected the attacks to be inspired by acts of Islamic terrorism in France. In a discussion with The Washington Post, he said that while he was against the use of violence, he still supported a sort of "counter-revolt" against non-White immigration and had no issues with the majority of his supporters' beliefs. Scholar Jean-Yves Camus sees Tarrant's ideas as more extreme than Camus' replacement theory, and argues that they are more firmly rooted in Jean Raspail's thinking.

2019 El Paso shooting 
Likewise, Tarrant's manifesto and the Great Replacement theory were also cited in The Inconvenient Truth by Patrick Crusius, the suspected perpetrator of the 2019 El Paso shooting at a Walmart store in El Paso, Texas, United States, that killed 23 people and injured 23 others.

2022 Buffalo shooting 
The suspected perpetrator of the 2022 Buffalo shooting, Payton Gendron, killed ten people and injured three others; 11 of the victims were black. Gendron is reported to have written a manifesto, describing himself as a white supremacist and voicing support for the far-right Great Replacement conspiracy theory of Renaud Camus. The attack has been described as an act of domestic terrorism, and the incident is being investigated as racially motivated. The author also expressed support for other far-right mass shooters Dylann Roof, Anders Behring Breivik, and Brenton Tarrant. About 28 percent of the document is plagiarized from other sources, especially Tarrant's manifesto.

Selected works 

Novels
 Passage. Flammarion (1975) 
 Échange. Flammarion (1976) 
 Roman roi. P.O.L. (1983) 
 Roman furieux (Roman roi II). P.O.L. (1987) 
 Voyageur en automne. P.O.L. (1992) 
 Le Chasseur de lumières. P.O.L. (1993) 
 L'épuisant désir de ces choses. P.O.L. (1995) 
 L'Inauguration de la salle des Vents. Fayard (2003) 
 Loin. P.O.L. (2009) 

Chronicles
 Journal d'un voyage en France. Hachette (1981) 
 Tricks. P.O.L. (1979) 
 transl. Tricks: 25 encounters. Serpent's Tail (1995) 
 Buena Vista Park. Hachette (1980) 
 Incomparable, with Farid Tali. P.O.L. (1999) 
 Retour à Canossa. Journal 1999. Fayard (2002) 

Political writings
 Du sens. P.O.L. (2002) 
 Le communisme du XXIe siècle. Xenia (2007) 
 La Grande Déculturation. Fayard (2008) 
 De l'In-nocence. Abécédaire. David Reinharc (2010) 
 Décivilisation. Fayard (2011) 
 Le Grand Remplacement. David Reinharc (2011) 
 L'Homme remplaçable. Self-published (2012) 
 Le Changement de peuple. Self-published (2013) 
 Les Inhéritiers. Self-published (2013) 
 You Will Not Replace Us! Self-published (2018) 
 Lettre aux Européens : entée de cent une propositions (with Karim Ouchikh). Self-published (2019)
 Le Petit Remplacement. Pierre-Guillaume de Roux (2019) 
 La Dépossession : ou Du remplacisme global. La Nouvelle Librairie (2022)

Notes

References

External links 
 Personal website including the online book Burnt Boats (Vaisseaux brûlés)
 Renaud Camus at publisher's site
 Renaud Camus readers society site

1946 births
Living people
20th-century French male writers
20th-century French novelists
21st-century French male writers
21st-century French novelists
Alt-right writers
Anti-immigration activists
European white nationalists
French male non-fiction writers
French male novelists
French gay writers
Identitarian movement in France
French LGBT novelists
LGBT conservatism
French conspiracy theorists
French critics of Islam
Pan-European nationalism
Paris 2 Panthéon-Assas University alumni
People educated at St. Clare's, Oxford
People from Chamalières
Prix Fénéon winners
Sciences Po alumni
University of Paris alumni
Writers from Auvergne-Rhône-Alpes